Paizabad (also Romanized as Pā’īzābād) is a village in Gavrud Rural District, in the Central District of Sonqor County, Kermanshah Province, Iran. At the 2006 census, its population was 464, in 107 families.

References 

Populated places in Sonqor County